Kroniki Policyjne (Polish for police chronicles) is an album released by Polish punk rock band The Analogs.

Track listing
Titles in brackets are translated from Polish.
 "Wszystko to co Mamy" (All What We Have)
 "Nasze Piosenki" (Our Songs)
 "Dziewczyna ze Zdjęcia" (A Girl From the Picture)
 "Blues Pudła w Folsom" (Johnny Cash cover) (Folsom Prison Blues)
 "Droga Pod Wiatr" (A Road Against the Wind)
 "Kroniki Policyjne" (Police Chronicles)
 "Mamy Mały Potwór" (Social Distortion cover) (Mommy's Little Monster)
 "Marek"
 "Miasta Gorzki Smak" (Cities' Bitter Taste)
 "Nasza Krew" (Our Blood)
 "Życie to jest Gra" (Life is a Game)
 "Twoje Kłamstwa" (Your Lies)
 "Mili Chłopcy" (Rose Tattoo cover) (Nice Boys)
 "Pożegnanie" (Farewell)

Bonus
 "Twoje Kłamstwa" (video)

Personnel
Paweł Czekała - bass guitar
Paweł Boguszewski - drums
Piotr Półtorak - guitar
Jakub Krawczyk - guitar
Dominik Pyrzyna - vocals

Notes
This song is dedicated to band's friends, Iwan and Sebastian, who were already dead. The Analogs are singing about hooligans paradise somewhere in heaven, where they are supposed to meet one day.

External links
  The Analogs official website
  Jimmy Jazz Records

2004 albums
The Analogs albums
Jimmy Jazz Records albums